Wooden Holy Trinity Church was built in suburb of Zhovkva, Ukraine in 1720 on the place of a church that burned down in 1717. The structure consists of three wooden naves and a brick sacristy.

There is an iconostasis consisting of about 50 icons painted by the masters of Zhovkva Painting and Carving School of Ivan Rutkovych in the beginning of 18th century. The iconostasis is made from linden wood carved by Ignatiy Stobenskyi. In 1978–79, iconostasis was restored. Now the church belongs to the UGCC.

On the church's walls one can find the plates confirming that the building is an architecture monument built in 1720.

On June 21, 2013, during the 37th Session of the UNESCO World Heritage Committee in Cambodja the Holy Trinity Church was added to the UNESCO World Heritage List among 16 wooden tserkvas of Carpathian Region in Poland and Ukraine.

References 

Churches in Zhovkva
Wooden tserkvas of Carpathian region in Poland and Ukraine
World Heritage Sites in Ukraine
Churches completed in 1720
Ukrainian Catholic churches in Ukraine
1720 establishments in Europe